Amand Geogg (born in Germany; 1820-1897) was a journalist and a democrat.  In 1849, he became a member of the provisional revolutionary government in Baden.  He was a member of the First International and in the 1870s he joined the German Social Democratic Party.  Amand Geogg died in 1897.

Goegg was married to the Swiss feminist Marie Goegg-Pouchoulin.

References

External links
 

1820 births
1897 deaths
German journalists
German male journalists
Social Democratic Party of Germany politicians
19th-century German journalists
19th-century German male writers